Godfried Leonard Roëll (5 April 1908 – 17 March 1934) was a Dutch rower. He competed at the 1932 Summer Olympics in the coxless pairs, together with Pieter Roelofsen, and finished fourth, 0.2 seconds behind the third place. Roëll and Roelofsen won the European title in 1931.

Roëll died in a motorcycle crash when he was aged 25.

References

1908 births
1934 deaths
Dutch male rowers
Olympic rowers of the Netherlands
Rowers at the 1932 Summer Olympics
Sportspeople from Utrecht (city)
European Rowing Championships medalists
20th-century Dutch people